Regeneration, while sometimes perceived to be a step in the  ('order of salvation'), is generally understood in Christian theology to be the objective work of God in a believer's life. Spiritually, it means that God brings a person to new life (that they are "born again") from a previous state of separation from God and subjection to the decay of death (Ephesians 2:5). Thus, in Lutheran and Roman Catholic theology, it generally means that which takes place during baptism. In Calvinism (Reformed theology) and Arminian theology, baptism is recognized as an outward sign of an inward reality which is to follow regeneration as a sign of obedience to the New Testament; as such, the Methodist Churches teach that regeneration occurs during the new birth.

While the exact Greek noun "rebirth" or "regeneration" appears just twice in the New Testament (Matthew  and Titus ), regeneration represents a wider theme of re-creation and spiritual rebirth.

Furthermore, there is the sense in which regeneration includes the concept "being born again" (John  and 1 Peter ). Regeneration is also called the "second birth". When Christians believe in Jesus Christ for their salvation, they are then born of God, "begotten of him" (1 John 5:1). As a result of becoming part of God's family, man believes to become a different and new creature (2 Corinthians 5:17).

New Testament references
In , Jesus refers to "the regeneration" (e.g. translations in the Geneva Bible, King James Version, and American Standard Version). The New International Version refers to "the renewal of all things" and the English Standard Version refers to "the new world".

In  the writer of the epistle refers to two aspects of the mercy which God has shown believers, "the washing of regeneration (i.e. baptism) and renewing of the Holy Spirit."

Historical interpretations
Anglican Bishop Charles Ellicott notes the "wide range" of meaning: in Titus 3:5, "the word ... is applied to baptism, as the instrument of the regeneration or new birth of the individual believer", but "there is to be a 'new birth' for mankind as well as for the individual". However, much of the historical theological interpretation of "regeneration" has focused on individual renewal, as shown in the following theological schools of thought:

Baptismal regeneration | Lutheranism and Roman Catholicism 

Lutheran and Roman Catholic theology holds that "baptism confers cleansing of [original] sin, the infusion of regenerating grace and union with Christ." Official Roman Catholic teaching specifically states that regeneration commences with baptism.

General evangelicalism

During the period of the Great Awakening, emphasis in Protestant theology began to be placed on regeneration as the starting point of an individual's new life in Christ.

Pelagianism

Pelagius believed that people were born pure, with God's spirit already at work, making the need for spiritual regeneration from a previous sinful state irrelevant. Since Pelagius, modernist theology has seen regeneration as more a matter of education than spiritual renewal.

Calvinism and Reformed theology
Reformed theology teaches that regeneration precedes faith through the doctrine of Total depravity. Before regeneration a sinner is dead and until the sinner is regenerated and given a new nature, the sinner cannot believe.

Reformed theology characteristically views baptism as an outward sign of God's internal work, as John Calvin stated: “all who are clothed with the righteousness of Christ are at the same time regenerated by the Spirit, and that we have an earnest of this regeneration in baptism.” Regeneration is further described as the "secret operation of the Holy Spirit."

Arminianism
Arminian theology teaches that the first steps are taken by God in the form of prevenient grace. Arminians differ from Calvinists in affirming that God's grace is resistible. "When our wills are freed, we can either accept God’s saving grace in faith or reject it to our own ruin." When someone believes, it is not grace which makes one to differ from another person, but the freed response to exercise faith to accept that grace. According to Classical Arminians if a person is regenerated it is due to that person's response to grace with faith alone; if a person is rejected, it is due to that person's choice alone. Prevenient grace is appropriated or rejected before regeneration; those who do not reject it come into the light by grace in concert with their freed will operating synergistically. After a believer has under the influence of prevenient grace made the faithful decision to follow Christ, God regenerates them spiritually. In contrast to Calvinism, which teaches that regeneration is the decree of God, Arminianism teaches that a sinner must repent and place their faith in Christ as the condition to regeneration and, in this manner, regeneration is by faith, not by decree.

Wesleyan–Arminian theology teaches that the New Birth contains two phases that occur together, justification and regeneration:

Quakerism
The Central Yearly Meeting of Friends, a Holiness Quaker denomination, teaches that regeneration is the "divine work of initial salvation (Tit. 3:5), or conversion, which involves the accompanying works of justification (Rom. 5:18) and adoption (Rom. 8:15, 16)." In regeneration, which occurs in the New Birth, there is a "transformation in the heart of the believer wherein he finds himself a new creation in Christ (II Cor. 5:17; Col. 1:27)."

See also
 Altar call
 Augustine of Hippo
 Born again
 Conversion to Christianity
 Decision theology
 Evangelicalism
 Evangelism
 Free will in theology
 Holy Spirit
 Justus Velsius
 Monergism and synergism
 Sinner's prayer

References

Notes

External links

 

Christian personal development
Christian soteriology
Christian terminology